The 2023 Nigerian presidential election in Benue State will be held on 25 February 2023 as part of the nationwide 2023 Nigerian presidential election to elect the president and vice president of Nigeria. Other federal elections, including elections to the House of Representatives and the Senate, will also be held on the same date while state elections will be held two weeks afterward on 11 March.

Background
Benue State is a diverse, agriculture-based state in the Middle Belt; although it is nicknamed the "Food Basket of the Nation" and has vast natural resources, Benue has faced challenges in security as inter-ethnic violence and conflict between herders and farmers heavily affect the state. The overproliferation of weaponry and increased pressure for land along with failures in governance led to the worsening of these clashes in the years ahead of the election.

Politically, Benue's 2019 elections were categorized as a swing back towards the PDP in the aftermath of Ortom's 2018 defection back to the party. On the federal level, PDP nominee Atiku Abubakar narrowly won the state after Buhari had won it in 2015; legislatively, the PDP swept all three Senate seats and won seven House of Representatives seats. Statewise, PDP Governor Samuel Ortom won re-election by over 10% of the vote and the PDP won a majority in the House of Assembly.

Polling

Projections

General election

Results

By senatorial district 
The results of the election by senatorial district.

By federal constituency
The results of the election by federal constituency.

By local government area 
The results of the election by local government area.

See also 
 2023 Benue State elections
 2023 Nigerian presidential election

Notes

References 

Benue State gubernatorial election
2023 Benue State elections
Benue